Something I've Been Meaning to Tell You is a book of short stories by Alice Munro, published by McGraw-Hill (Canada) in 1974.

Stories
 "Something I've Been Meaning to Tell You"
 "Material"
 "How I Met My Husband"
 "Walking on Water"
 "Forgiveness in Families"
 "Tell Me Yes or No"
 "The Found Boat"
 "Executioners"
 "Marrakesh"
 "The Spanish Lady"
 "Winter Wind"
 "Memorial"
 "The Ottawa Valley"

1974 short story collections
Short story collections by Alice Munro
McGraw-Hill books